Ukase 43 was the 19 April 1943 ukase (decree) of the Supreme Soviet of the USSR. Its full title was "On measures for the punishment of German-Fascist criminals who are guilty of killing or maltreating Soviet civilians and Red Army prisoners-of-war and for the punishment of spies and traitors to their fatherland among Soviet citizens and their helpers". The law was directed at the German, Romanian, Hungarian, and Finnish personnel guilty of war crimes, as well as Soviet citizens who collaborated with the enemy.

Under the law, Soviet tribunals prosecuted members of the Wehrmacht, SS, SD, Order Police, and the Nazi civilian administration in the formerly occupied territories. The decree was issued on the same date as the Soviet authorities broke off relations with the Polish government-in-exile in the aftermath of the discovery of the site of the Katyn massacre. Ukase 43 can thus be viewed as part of the Soviet response to the diplomatic crisis, aimed at drawing the attention of the world public to the crimes of Germany and its allies.

See also
Moscow Declarations

References

 

1943 in the Soviet Union
Soviet decrees